The grape reaction product (GRP, GRP1 or 2-S-glutathionyl caftaric acid) is a phenolic compound explaining the disappearance of caftaric acid from grape must during processing. It is also found in aged red wines. Its enzymatic production by polyphenol oxidase is important in limiting the browning of musts, especially in white wine production. The product can be recreated in model solutions.

Determining its concentration in wine is possible by mass spectrometry.

S-Glutathionyl caftaric acid is itself oxidizable. It is not a substrate for grape polyphenol oxidase, but laccase from Botrytis cinerea can use it to form GRP2.

Related molecules 
Other related molecules are trans-caffeoyltartrate derivatives like GRP o-quinone and 2,5-di-S-glutathionyl cafteoyl tartrate (GRP2) or adducts with anthocyanidins.

See also 
 Phenolic compounds in wine

References 

Hydroxycinnamic acid esters
Vinylogous carboxylic acids
Catechols